The 348th Brigade Support Battalion (348th BSB) is a brigade support battalion of the United States Army. It provides direct support level logistics to the 648th Maneuver Enhancement Brigade (648th MEB).

History 
The 348th Brigade Support Battalion was constituted 1 September 2009 in the Georgia Army National Guard as the 348th Support Battalion and was organized 3 June 2010 from new and existing elements, with headquarters at Cumming, Georgia.

Leadership and organization

Organization
Headquarters and Headquarters Company (HHC) – located in Ellenwood, GA provides mission command for organic and attached units assigned to the Brigade Support Battalion (BSB).
Alpha Company (Distribution) – Ellenwood, GA provides transportation and supply support to the 648th Maneuver Enhancement Brigade (648th MEB).
Constituted 1 September 2009 in the Georgia Army National Guard, and organized 3 June 2010 from new and existing elements, with Headquarters at Cumming.
Bravo Company (Maintenance) – Hinesville, GA provides field level maintenance support to the 648th Maneuver Enhancement Brigade (648th MEB) and attached units.

Lineage and honors

Campaign participation credit 
Company B (Liberty Independent Troop-Hinesville) entitled to:

Awards and decorations 
Company B (Liberty Independent Troop – Hinesville), entitled to:
 Presidential Unit Citation (Army), Streamer embroidered PAPUA
 Philippine Presidential Unit Citation, Streamer embroidered 17 OCTOBER 1944 TO 4 JULY 1945

References 

BSB 0348
Military units and formations established in 2009